The Mayo Clinic Arizona is a short term acute care hospital in Phoenix, Arizona. This  out of state campus of the original Mayo Clinic in Rochester, Minnesota opened in June 1987.  The hospital provides inpatient and outpatient services, as well as teaching and research. The Mayo Clinic Arizona has a nearby, associated Scottsdale campus, which offers outpatient services and hosts an Arizona branch of the Mayo Clinic Alix School of Medicine.

History
After opening a second branch of the Mayo Clinic in Jacksonville, Florida in 1986, the Mayo Clinic opened a third branch in Scottsdale, Arizona in June 1987. The initial staff in Scottsdale included 47 physicians and 225 allied health workers. The Scottsdale campus includes the Mayo Clinic Building, the Samuel C. Johnson Research Building and the Mayo Clinic Collaborative Research Building. Later, a hospital campus was added in Phoenix, fourteen miles away.  

In 2018, the Mayo Clinic announced a $648 million expansion called Arizona.Bold.Forward. to nearly double the size of its campus in Phoenix by 2024. The Mayo Clinic Alix School of Medicine expanded its four-year medical school class to the Mayo Clinic Arizona campus in 2017.

Health services
Health services offered at the Mayo Clinic in Phoenix include: clinical laboratory, diagnostic imaging, emergency room, inpatient care to support the medical and surgical specialties and programs, lung testing, noninvasive heart tests, and a Organ transplant center.

Latest rankings
Mayo Clinic Arizona was ranked regionally as number 1 in Arizona and number 1 in Phoenix by U.S. News & World Report Rankings in 20202021. During this same period, it was ranked nationally as number 15 in the Best Hospitals Honor Roll and received national ranking in 11 adult specialties.

See also
Mayo Clinic Hospital (Rochester)
Mayo Clinic Florida
Mayo Clinic Alix School of Medicine
Mayo Clinic Cancer Center

References

Hospitals in Arizona
Hospitals established in 1987
Mayo Clinic